The Avio Design Swan is a family of Bulgarian ultralight trikes, designed and produced by Avio Design of Kazanlak. The aircraft are all supplied as a complete ready-to-fly-aircraft.

Design and development
All models feature a cable-braced hang glider-style high-wing, weight-shift controls, a two-seats-in-tandem open cockpit, tricycle landing gear with wheel pants and a single engine in pusher configuration.

The aircraft is made from bolted-together aluminum tubing, with its double surface wing covered in Dacron sailcloth. Typical wings used have a  span wing, are supported by a single tube-type kingpost and use an "A" frame weight-shift control bar. The standard powerplant is the twin cylinder, air-cooled, two-stroke, dual-ignition  Rotax 582 engine.  Options do not include the  Rotax 912 engine.

Variants
Classic Swan I
Basic model with partial cockpit fairing.
Migrator Swan I
Model with upgraded features and optional agricultural spray equipment as well as with partial cockpit fairing.
Meteor Swan II
Model with upgraded options as standard equipment and a full cockpit fairing.
Skyter Swan II
Model with maximum number of options as standard equipment  and a full cockpit fairing.

Specifications (Migrator Swan I)

References

External links

2000s Bulgarian sport aircraft
2000s Bulgarian ultralight aircraft
Homebuilt aircraft
Single-engined pusher aircraft
Ultralight trikes
Avio Design aircraft